Reticutriton is a genus of predatory sea snails, marine gastropod mollusks in the family Cymatiidae.

Species
The genus Reticutriton contains the following species:
 † Reticutriton carlottae (Ferreira & da Cunha, 1957) 
 † Reticutriton elsmerensis (English, 1914) 
 Reticutriton lineatus (Broderip, 1833)
 Reticutriton pfeifferianus (Reeve, 1844)

References

 Habe T. & Kosuge S. (1966). Shells of the world in colour, Vol. II. The Tropical Pacific. Osaka: Hoikusha. vii + 193 pp, 68 pls
 Beu A.G. 2010 [August]. Neogene tonnoidean gastropods of tropical and South America: contributions to the Dominican Republic and Panama Paleontology Projects and uplift of the Central American Isthmus. Bulletins of American Paleontology 377-378: 550 pp, 79 pls.

Cymatiidae